The Ronkonkoma Moraine, in the geography of Long Island, forms the southern of two ridges along Long Island's "backbone."

Description 
The Ronkonkoma Moraine, a terminal moraine, predates the Harbor Hill Moraine (which reached Long Island during the Wisconsin Glacial Episode); the Harbor Hill Moraine cut through the Ronkonkoma Moraine's western portions.

The Ronkonkoma Moraine and the Harbor Hill Moraine intersect at Lake Success in western Nassau County. Today, the moraine is most prominent in Suffolk County, where it traverses the center of Long Island and forms the South Fork.

Notable summits 

 Bald Hill – 331 ft (101 m)
 Telescope Hill – 334 feet (102 m)

See also 

 Terminal moraine
 List of glacial moraines

References 

Geography of Long Island
Moraines of the United States
Landforms of Suffolk County, New York